The Gumby Show is an American clay animation television series developed by Art Clokey. In the United States, the first episode of the series originally aired on Howdy Doody in 1955. The series was revived multiple times, with the last episode airing on December 31, 1988. The first season was broadcast on NBC, while the following seasons were made for syndication. A majority of the episodes are available on DVD in multiple regions, as well as via online streaming services.

Series overview

Pilots
Art Clokey's first clay animation film was Gumbasia (1953), a short film showcasing a series of clay shapes twisting, turning and contorting in kaleidoscopic patterns. Clokey showed the film to producer Sam Engel, who suggested that Clokey apply the technique to form children's stories. In 1955, Clokey filmed the first pilot called "Adventures of Gumby", but it was never aired. Shortly afterward, Clokey made the second pilot through the financial assistance of Engel, entitled "Gumby on the Moon", which marked Gumby's debut on television. The pilot was then shown on Howdy Doody to much success, and greenlighted development of The Gumby Show.

Episodes
Since information about the original airdates or original production order is unknown, these listings are reasonable estimates of the original production order. The following was compiled based on the evolution of the voices and appearance of the characters. Most of the 1950s episodes were originally presented as 11-minute stories, but they were split up and presented as separate entries when syndicated along with episodes produced in the 1960s. Several of these abbreviated versions borrow footage from their counterparts, while some had new material filmed specifically for these shorter versions (as evidenced by a brief change in how the characters look in the newer footage). New title sequences were filmed for half of these, while the other half retained the original title sequence. For identification purposes, all 1950s episodes have been listed with the original title of the uncut version followed by any counterparts that were created when these episodes were split up.

Season 1 (1956)

Syndicated revival (1960–68)

Gumby Adventures (1988)
The show was revived in 1988 as Gumby Adventures with 99 new episodes and five shorts ("Gone Clayzy", "Gumball Gumby", "Chatter Box", "Clay Trix", and "The Funny Bathtub"). The shorts, as well as the re-recorded editions of The Gumby Show, were included with the revival's syndication.

Bumpers
Pokey shoots Gumby out of a cannon.
Pokey rolls a giant green ball of clay off the cliff and it becomes nine mini Gumbys.
Gumby inflates a balloon, but gets inflated into a bigger and fatter version with Pokey by his side.
Pokey throws a baseball, Gumby swings the bat but misses, and then a springy noise is made.
Gumby and Pokey are aerial fighters, and Gumby leaves an ammo hole shaped like him.
Gumby and Pokey are inside the rocket about the blast off and leave behind a cloud in a shape of Gumby.
Gumby and Pokey chess board.
Gumby turns into a puddle, Pokey pops out from above the puddle, and enters the conference hall.
Gumby (Return) says, "Here comes another adventure with me and all my friends!"
Gumby (Commercial Break) says, "Don't go away! I'll be right back with all my pals after this."
Pokey (Return) says, "Holy Toledo! Here's another Gumby Adventure!"
Prickle (Commercial Break) says, "Hang on. Gumby will be right back after these messages. You can count on it."
Goo (Return) says, "Here comes more fun with Gumby and pals!" (Note: This bumper is heard in Freddy's Nightmares episode, The End of the World.)
Professor Kapp (Commercial Break) says, "Goodness gracious! There will be more Gumby Adventures right after this!"
Gumbo and Gumba (Return) – Gumbo says, "Here comes another adventure with our son Gumby, and his friends." Then Gumba says, "I'm so proud of our boy!"
Minga (Commercial Break) says, "Stay right here. My brother Gumby will be back after these messages."

Home media

Official releases
On June 24, 2015, it was announced that NCircle Entertainment has acquired the distribution rights to the original 1950s and 1960s series, the 1980s revival series and Gumby: The Movie in Region 1. It was announced that they would release The Gumby Show: The Complete 50s Series on DVD on September 22, 2015. The Gumby Show: The 60s Series Volume 1 followed on February 23, 2016 and The Gumby Show: The 60s Series Volume 2 on September 13, 2016. There are five episodes that were omitted in the 1960s volumes because they contain what are now considered politically incorrect stereotypes of Native Americans. These episodes are "Siege of Boonesborough", "Pokey's Price", "Gold Rush Gumby", "Indian Country" and "The Indian Challenge".

In 2013, Beyond Home Entertainment released the complete series on NTSC DVDs in Australia as a JB Hi-Fi exclusive. This is a seven-disc, collector's edition set within a tin steelbook case and includes Gumbasia, six "bumper" clips, and every episode from the 1950s, 1960s, and 1980s (including the five shorts skipped over on other sets). The film transfers are said to be the Premavision authorized official versions which are all new restorations from the original negatives and can be played on Regions 1 & 4 DVD players (possibly other regions as well).

Throughout the 1980s Family Home Entertainment released a majority of the 1950s and 1960s Gumby episodes on various VHS collections (the only episodes that didn't get a release were "This Little Piggy", "Tricky Train", and "Foxy Box"). These all retained their original audio tracks as they were released prior to the 1987 revival series, in which completely new soundtracks had to be recorded due to licensing issues involving the original soundtracks.

In 2002, Kid Rhino Home Video (a division distributed by Warner Bros. Family Entertainment and WEA) (a subsidiary of AOL Time Warner) released a seven-disc DVD compilation containing 110 episodes from the 1950s and 1960s. The set was not widely distributed, and it received much negative feedback because the film elements used were the 1980s reissues with the redubbed soundtracks and voices. Three years later, Rhino Home Video/Rhino Retrovision released a two-volume set entitled The Very Best New Adventures of Gumby.

Classic Media had a few home media releases of Gumby starting on September 4, 2007 with Gumby Essentials, Volume 1, which contained episodes from each season of the show. In 2008, Classic Media released a director's cut of Gumby: The Movie that included bonus episodes from the series. That same year, the company also released a two-disc DVD set containing four Christmas themed programs. In addition to a compilation of Gumby episodes titled Gumby Season's Greetings, the other programs include Casper the Friendly Ghost, Fat Albert, and George of the Jungle.

In the fall of 2010, Columbia Music Entertainment released two compilation DVDs in Japan titled  with permission from Premavision and Classic Media. The two DVD series contains the best selected episodes from both 1950s–1960s era to the 1980s era, all digitally remastered and each have Japanese subtitles. Two DVDs were released: Gumby Best Selection: Early Years 50s-60s, released on September 1, 2010 followed by its English subtitled version on November 17, 2010 and Gumby Best Selection: 80s, released on November 17, 2010.

Unofficial releases
There have been many home media releases that were not authorized by Art Clokey or Clokey Productions, and therefore are considered unofficial releases.

In 1994, GoodTimes Entertainment released Christmas with Gumby on VHS. The set features "Scrooge Loose", "Santa-Witch", "Pigeon in a Plum Tree", and "Toy Crazy"/"Toy Joy" edited together as one half-hour program without any episode title sequences. It was re-released on DVD in 2003. GoodTimes Entertainment also released the VHS Fun with Gumby in 1994, containing the episodes "The Kachinas", "Tree Trouble", "Lion Drive", "Yard Work Made Easy", and "The Magic Show" (edited for time).

In 1996, GoodTimes Entertainment released the VHS Gumby's Greatest Adventures. Later released on DVD in 2003, the set features "Toying Around", "Sad King Ott's Daughter", "The Blockheads", "Gumby Crosses the Delaware" (edited for time), "Gumby Concerto", "The Glob", "Gold Rush Gumby", "Baker's Tour" (edited for time), "The Black Knight", and "Gumby Racer".

In 2013, Legend Films released Gumby's Best Episodes (The Original Adventures) on DVD. The set includes: "Tree Trouble", "Lion Drive", "Yard Work Made Easy", "Sad King Otts Daughter", "The Blockheads", "Gumby Concerto", "The Glob", "Bakers Tour", "The Black Knight", "The Kachinas", "In a Fix", "The Witty Witch", "The Groobee", "Gumby Racer", "Rain for Roo", and "Hidden Valley".

Public domain
Many budget-priced DVD collections can be found at dollar stores because some episodes have fallen into the public domain. Gumby episodes believed to be in the public domain include "Too Loo", "Gumby Concerto", "Robot Rumpus", "Mysterious Fires," "Stuck on Books", "Gold Rush Gumby", and "Tricky Train". These collections also often include Clokey's experimental film, Gumbasia.

Restoration
From 2005 to 2006 and from 2012 to 2013, a project took place in attempt to restore the entire 1950s and 1960s Gumby library. These versions are all official and authorized as they contain Premavision copyright notices at the beginning. By 2006, a total of 36 restored transfers existed (33 episodes, the pilot cutdown "Gumby on the Moon", the experimental film "Gumbasia" and a stand-alone transfer of the 1964 theme-song intro), with the rest of the series being completed by 2013. The 1950s episodes were assembled back to their original 11-minute format as close as possible with the existing material. These restorations were not perfect as the original negatives for the 11-minute versions appear to be lost and now only exist split into their syndication halves. This is very noticeable as the restoration for "The Magic Show"/"The Magic Wand" retains the 1960s title sequence "The Magic Wand" instead of the original title sequence "The Magic Show". On a similar note, a narration track recorded for the beginning of the syndicated half titled "Gumby Concerto" is still heard on the restoration for "Too Loo"/"Gumby Concerto". These restored versions have since been released on DVD by Classic Media (the rights holder at the time the first batch of restorations were done) and NCircle Entertainment.

Online distribution
In 2007, the batch of restored versions were made available to view and/or download on various Internet video sites. Most of them were first made available for free viewing on AOL's In2TV, while later a select few became available on YouTube. These episodes were also made available to purchase through Amazon's video-on-demand service Amazon Video. A few of the later additions to YouTube wound up being sourced from 1980s VHS transfers from Family Home Entertainment instead of actually being restored versions, indicating that the project to restore the entire Gumby library might have been either abandoned or temporarily stalled. The complete 1987 series was later added to Amazon. While many of the aforementioned services are no longer active, Legend Films' Gumby's Best Episodes is available for streaming on Hulu.

In November 2014, the entire first and second seasons of Gumby were launched on television and online via the children's on demand network Kabillion.

References

Gumby